Kensington & Fairfield is a Liverpool City Council Ward in the Liverpool Wavertree Parliamentary constituency. The population of this ward taken at the 2011 census was 15,377. It contains the Kensington and Fairfield areas of Liverpool. It was formed for the 2004 municipal elections taking most of the former Kensington ward and small parts of the former Smithdown and Tuebrook wards.

Councillors
The ward has returned seven councillors.

 indicates seat up for re-election after boundary changes.

 indicates seat up for re-election.

 indicates change in affiliation.

 indicates seat up for re-election after casual vacancy.

Election results

Elections of the 2010s

Elections of the 2000s 

After the boundary change of 2004 the whole of Liverpool City Council faced election. Three Councillors were returned.

• italics - Denotes the sitting Councillor.
• bold - Denotes the winning candidate.

Notes

External links
 Liverpool City Council: Ward profile

References

Wards of Liverpool